Wabu Lake() is a freshwater lake in China, it is located in the center of Anhui Province, situated in the south bank of the middle reaches of the Huai River.

Notes

Lakes of Anhui